Sir Brian Keith Follett  (born 22 February 1939) is a British biologist, academic administrator, and policy maker. His research focused upon how the environment, particularly the annual change in day-length (photoperiod), controls breeding in birds and mammals. Knighted in 1992, he won the Frink Medal (1993) and has been a Fellow of the Royal Society since 1984, and served as the Chair of the UK government's teacher training agency and Arts and Humanities Research Council, and was Vice-Chancellor of  University of Warwick.

Education and early life 
Follett was educated at Bournemouth School and studied biological chemistry. On graduating he undertook a Ph.D. with Professor Hans Heller in the Department of Pharmacology.  That work introduced him to endocrinology and the development of assays to understand the physiological role of hormones.

Career and research 
In 1964 Follett moved to Washington State University and joined Donald Farner's group investigating photoperiodism.  Follett's research focus became on the brain pathways whereby birds (and mammals) measure day length and use its changes to regulate breeding. He became a lecturer at Leeds University then moved with James Dodd FRS group to the University of Bangor in 1969, then to the University of Bristol in 1978.  

He moved to Warwick in 1993 as Vice-Chancellor.

Research programmes 
Follett's studies used, as model species, the Japanese quail and later wild-caught starlings. His work included the development of the first radioimmunoassay to measure bird luteinizing hormone (LH) in collaboration with Frank Cunningham (Reading University) and Colin Scanes.  This made it possible to measure LH in 10 microliters of plasma and so follow circulating hormone levels in individual birds exposed to photoperiods of many types. Using gonadectomized quail it was possible to show unequivocally that the underlying photoperiodic response in birds (but not mammals) is driven by brain circuits that are switched on an off by day length. It demonstrated that measuring day length involved a daily (circadian) rhythm in photosensitivity with the birds being responsive to light particularly 12 and 18 hours after dawn. In other words, if light fell at these hours then the day was read as “long”, if not then it was read as “short”. 

In 1978 as  the Chair of Zoology at Bristol, his research interest included mammals, notably sheep, and occasionally wild birds such as albatrosses, swans, gulls and partridges. Key studies included:

(a) The development of a rapid photoperiodic response system: 

The research group followed the neural and endocrine changes as photoinduction as it occurred in real time.  The first overt change when quail are exposed to a single long day is a rise in LH secretion at about hour 20. This model was applied: to show definitively the circadian nature of the photoperiodic clock and its complex properties as an oscillator, to measure (with Russell Foster) the action spectrum for the non-retinal light receptors, and in many studies to determine the timed sequence of neural changes as induction occurred.  Subsequently, Takashi Yoshimura in Japan used the quail to investigate these changes in molecular terms and was able to connect these into the separate discoveries that thyroid hormones play a critical role in the photoperiodic response (see below). 

(b) The termination of seasonal reproduction (refractoriness):

The photoperiodic response that long days (or short days in sheep) can not only induce reproductive maturity but also end it. The gonads suddenly collapse and this has evolved as a means of ensuring each species has an optimal but limited time to breed each year. The term refractoriness is used since the animal becomes refractory to the prevailing photoperiod. The Bristol group found, quite counterintuitively, that thyroid hormones are critical for refractoriness to develop and be maintained. This had been tentatively suggested in the Soviet Union prior to WWII but was developed by Trevor Nicholls, Arthur Goldsmith and Alistair Dawson. In simple terms, removal of the thyroid glands stopped refractoriness developing in starlings (and other birds) as well as sheep, and the animals remained in breeding condition perpetually and were not photorefractory. Thyroid hormone replacement reinstates the refractory state. Importantly birds are hatched in a refractory state but this is ended by removing the thyroid glands (per Tony Williams). The research group published papers on the concept which has become established in the understanding of the photoneuroendocrine pathway.

Funding came from the Agricultural and Food Research Council (AFRC), later renamed the Biotechnology and Biological Sciences Research Council (BBSRC), and Follett's group became a research council Research Group on Photoperiodism and Reproduction, with 413 scientific papers and reviews.

Academic administration 
Follett was Head of the Department of Zoology (later Biological Sciences) at the University of Bristol for fifteen years (1978-1993), and Biological Secretary of the Royal Society from 1978 until 1993. He then served for eight years as Vice-Chancellor of the University of Warwick. He was the founding Chair of the Arts and Humanities Research Council (2001-2009). He also chaired the government's Teacher Training Agency (TTA) and its successor body the Training and Development Agency for Schools (TDA) from 2004-2010. For sixteen years, Follett was a visiting Professor in Zoology at Oxford University, teaching environmental physiology to undergraduates.

Follett was appointed to the Council of the AFRC/BBSRC and then to the UFC (Universities Funding Council) and its subsequent body - HEFCE (Higher Education Funding Council for England). He served on the Council of London Zoo (and Bristol Zoo) and as a Trustee of the Natural History Museum. He was elected to the Royal Society in 1984 and volunteered as the Biological Secretary for six years, making changes to the organisation and extending the Royal Society University Fellowship scheme. He was knighted in 1992.

In 1992 he was appointed to the Vice-Chancellorship at the University of Warwick and led it from 1993 until 2001. The University improved its ranking in the published league tables with strengths in Engineering (Warwick Manufacturing Group), Mathematics, Economics, Sociology and the Humanities.  The Warwick Research Fellowships began as an annual £10m scheme in 1994, to attract the brightest young researchers in the UK and abroad. Success was seen in the Research Assessment Exercises of 1996 and 2001.  £100m of capital building was undertaken. Warwick is a founding member of the Russell Group. It opened a graduate-entry medical school in 2001, President Clinton, with Prime Minister Blair, visited the university and gave a valedictory speech on foreign policy. 

Follett has chaired committees for the UK government including reporting on the future of university libraries, research in the humanities, and the foot-and-mouth outbreak of 2001;  and on the management and appraisal of clinical academics (following the AlderHey scandal).  

Once retired, he took on the role of Chair of the Arts and Humanities Research Council (2001-2009, and chaired the government's Teacher Training Agency (TTA) and its successor body the Training and Development Agency for Schools (TDA) from 2004-2010. It aimed to resolve teacher training recruitment and to develop the concept of the teaching assistant.  Follett is a non-stipendiary visiting Professor in the Department of Zoology, University of Oxford (2001-2019) teaching physiology to undergraduates.  He was a Governor of the Royal Shakespeare Theatre (2008-2018), and is President of the Stratford Civic Society.

Honours 
 Elected to the Royal Society in 1984.  
 Knighted in 1992.  
 Awarded 13 honorary doctorates and other awards.

Personal life 
Follet married Deb Booth, a teacher in 1961, who later worked with radio and as the production editor for the journals of the Society for Endocrinology.  Their daughter Karen Williams is at BC Women's Hospital in Vancouver and son Richard Follett is on the faculty at the University of Sussex.

References

External links
 Webpage on Prof Brian Follett on Bristol University Website
 Webpage on Prof Brian Follett on Training and Development Agency for Schools website

1939 births
Living people
Knights Bachelor
Fellows of the Royal Society
Deputy Lieutenants of the West Midlands (county)
Vice-Chancellors of the University of Warwick
Scientists from Bournemouth
Alumni of the University of Bristol
English zoologists
Presidents of the Association for Science Education